About 490 species of mammals are recorded in the United States. Unincorporated territories like for example Puerto Rico, Guam or Northern Mariana Islands are not covered. Mammals introduced and extinct in the Holocene except Pleistocene/Holocene boundary are included.

According to the IUCN Red List 3 of these species are critically endangered, 20 endangered, 15 vulnerable, 20 near threatened and 4 extinct.

Some species are identified as indicated below:

(A) - Accidental
(E) - Extinct
(Ex) - Extirpated (extinct in the US, but exists elsewhere in the world)
(I) - Introduced

The following tags are used to highlight each species' conservation status as assessed by the International Union for Conservation of Nature:

(v. 2013.2, the data are current as of March 5, 2014)

and the Endangered Species Act:

(the data are current as of March 28, 2014)

Subclass: Theria

Infraclass: Metatheria

Order: Didelphimorphia (common opossums)

Didelphimorphia is the order of common opossums of the Western Hemisphere. Opossums probably diverged from the basic South American marsupials in the late Cretaceous or early Paleocene. They are small to medium-sized marsupials, about the size of a large house cat, with a long snout and prehensile tail.

Family: Didelphidae (American opossums)
Subfamily: Didelphinae
 Virginia opossum, D. virginiana

Infraclass: Eutheria

Order: Cingulata (armadillos)

The armadillos are small mammals with a bony armored shell. They are native to the Americas. There are around 20 extant species. Only the nine-banded armadillo is found in the United States.

Family: Dasypodidae (armadillos)
Subfamily: Dasypodinae
 Nine-banded armadillo, D. novemcinctus

Order: Rodentia (rodents)

Rodents make up the largest order of mammals, with over 40% of mammalian species. They have two incisors in the upper and lower jaw which grow continually and must be kept short by gnawing.
Suborder: Hystricognathi
Family: Erethizontidae (New World porcupines)
Subfamily: Erethizontinae
 North American porcupine, E. dorsatum  
Suborder: Sciurognathi
Family: Aplodontiidae (mountain beaver)
 Mountain beaver, A. rufa  
Family: Castoridae (beavers)
 American beaver, C. canadensis  
Family: Sciuridae (squirrels)
Subfamily: Sciurinae
Tribe: Pteromyini
 Northern flying squirrel, G. sabrinus  (Carolina northern flying squirrel G. s. coloratus, Virginia northern flying squirrel G. s. fuscus)
 Humboldt's flying squirrel, G.  oregonensis
 Southern flying squirrel, G. volans  
Tribe: Sciurini
 Abert's squirrel, S. aberti  
 Arizona gray squirrel, S. arizonensis  
 Eastern gray squirrel, S. carolinensis  
 Western gray squirrel, S. griseus  
 Mexican fox squirrel, S. nayaritensis  
 Fox squirrel, S. niger  (Delmarva fox squirrel,)
 Douglas squirrel, T. douglasii  
 Southwestern red squirrel, T. fremonti  (Mount Graham red squirrel,)
 North American red squirrel, T. hudsonicus  
Subfamily: Xerinae
Tribe: Marmotini
 Harris's antelope squirrel, A. harrisii  
 Texas antelope squirrel, A. interpres 
 White-tailed antelope squirrel, A. leucurus 
 San Joaquin antelope squirrel, A. nelsoni  
 Gunnison's prairie dog, C. gunnisoni  
 White-tailed prairie dog, C. leucurus  
 Black-tailed prairie dog, C. ludovicianus  
 Utah prairie dog, C. parvidens   
 Alaska marmot, M. broweri  (Alaska only) 
 Hoary marmot, M. caligata  
 Yellow-bellied marmot, M. flaviventris  
 Groundhog, M. monax  
 Olympic marmot, M. olympus  
 California ground squirrel, O. beecheyi   and:
 Douglas's ground squirrel, O. douglasii 
 Rock squirrel, O. variegatus  
 Golden-mantled ground squirrel, C. lateralis  
 Cascade golden-mantled ground squirrel, C. saturatus  
 Mohave ground squirrel, X. mohavensis  
 Spotted ground squirrel, X. spilosoma  
 Round-tailed ground squirrel, X. tereticaudus  
 Franklin's ground squirrel, P. franklinii  
 Mexican ground squirrel, I. mexicanus  
 Rio Grande ground squirrel, I. parvidens 
 Thirteen-lined ground squirrel, I. tridecemlineatus  
 Uinta ground squirrel, U. armatus  
 Belding's ground squirrel, U. beldingi  
 Northern Idaho ground squirrel, U. brunneus   and:
 Southern Idaho ground squirrel, U. endemicus  
 Columbian ground squirrel, U. columbianus  
 Wyoming ground squirrel, U. elegans  
 Arctic ground squirrel, U. parryii  (Alaska only) 
 Richardson's ground squirrel, U. richardsonii  
 Townsend's ground squirrel, U. townsendii   and:
Merriam's ground squirrel, U. canus  
Piute ground squirrel, U. mollis  
Townsend's ground squirrel, U. (townsendii) nancyae  
 Washington ground squirrel, U. washingtoni  
 Alpine chipmunk, N. alpinus  
 Yellow-pine chipmunk, N. amoenus   and:
 Crater chipmunk, N. cratericus 
 Gray-footed chipmunk, N. canipes  
 Gray-collared chipmunk, N. cinereicollis  
 Cliff chipmunk, N. dorsalis  
 Merriam's chipmunk, N. merriami  
 Least chipmunk, N. minimus   and:
 Coulee chipmunk, N. grisescens 
 California chipmunk, N. obscurus  
 Yellow-cheeked chipmunk, N. ochrogenys  
 Palmer's chipmunk, N. palmeri  
 Panamint chipmunk, N. panamintinus  
 Long-eared chipmunk, N. quadrimaculatus  
 Colorado chipmunk, N. quadrivittatus  
 Red-tailed chipmunk, N. ruficaudus  
 Hopi chipmunk, N. rufus  
 Allen's chipmunk, N. senex  
 Siskiyou chipmunk, N. siskiyou  
 Sonoma chipmunk, N. sonomae  
 Lodgepole chipmunk, N. speciosus  
 Eastern chipmunk, T. striatus  
 Townsend's chipmunk, N. townsendii  
 Uinta chipmunk, N. umbrinus  
Family: Geomyidae
 Desert pocket gopher, G. arenarius  
 Attwater's pocket gopher, G. attwateri  
 Baird's pocket gopher, G. breviceps  
 Plains pocket gopher, G. bursarius   and:
Hall's pocket gopher, G. jugossicularis 
Sand Hills pocket gopher, G. lutescens 
 Knox Jones's pocket gopher, G. knoxjonesi  
 Texas pocket gopher, G. personatus   and:
 Strecker's pocket gopher, G. streckeri 
 Southeastern pocket gopher, G. pinetis  
 Llano pocket gopher, G. texensis  
 Yellow-faced pocket gopher, P. castanops  
 Botta's pocket gopher, T. bottae  
 Camas pocket gopher, T. bulbivorus  
 Wyoming pocket gopher, T. clusius  
 Idaho pocket gopher, T. idahoensis  
 Mazama pocket gopher, T. mazama  
 Mountain pocket gopher, T. monticola  
 Northern pocket gopher, T. talpoides  
 Townsend's pocket gopher, T. townsendii  
 Southern pocket gopher, T. umbrinus  
Family: Heteromyidae
Subfamily: Dipodomyinae
 Agile kangaroo rat, D. agilis  
 California kangaroo rat, D. californicus  
 Gulf Coast kangaroo rat, D. compactus  
 Desert kangaroo rat, D. deserti  
 Texas kangaroo rat, D. elator  
 Heermann's kangaroo rat, D. heermanni  (Morro Bay kangaroo rat,)
 Giant kangaroo rat, D. ingens   
 Merriam's kangaroo rat, D. merriami   (San Bernardino kangaroo rat,)
 Chisel-toothed kangaroo rat, D. microps  
 Fresno kangaroo rat, D. nitratoides   (Fresno subspecies D. n. exilis and Tipton kangaroo rat,)
 Ord's kangaroo rat, D. ordii  
 Panamint kangaroo rat, D. panamintinus  
 Banner-tailed kangaroo rat, D. spectabilis  
 Stephens' kangaroo rat, D. stephensi   
 Dulzura kangaroo rat, D. simulans  
 Narrow-faced kangaroo rat, D. venustus   and:
 Big-eared kangaroo rat, D. (venustus) elephantinus
 Dark kangaroo mouse, M. megacephalus  
 Pale kangaroo mouse, M. pallidus  
Subfamily: Heteromyinae
 Mexican spiny pocket mouse, L. irroratus  
Subfamily: Perognathinae
 Bailey's pocket mouse, C. baileyi  
 California pocket mouse, Cv californicus  
 Nelson's pocket mouse, C. nelsoni  
 Chihuahuan pocket mouse, C. eremicus  
 San Diego pocket mouse, C. fallax  
 Long-tailed pocket mouse, C. formosus  
 Hispid pocket mouse, C. hispidus  
 Rock pocket mouse, C. intermedius  
 Desert pocket mouse, C. penicillatus  
 Baja pocket mouse, C. rudinoris  
 Spiny pocket mouse, C. spinatus  
 White-eared pocket mouse, P. alticola  
 Arizona pocket mouse, P. amplus  
 Olive-backed pocket mouse, P. fasciatus  
 Plains pocket mouse, P. flavescens  
 Silky pocket mouse, P. flavus  
 San Joaquin pocket mouse, P. inornatus  
 Little pocket mouse, P. longimembris  (Pacific pocket mouse,)
 Merriam's pocket mouse, P. merriami  
 Columbia Plateau pocket mouse, P. parvus  
Family: Zapodidae (jumping mice)
 Eastern woodland jumping mouse, N. insignis   and:
 Western woodland jumping mouse, N. abietorum 
 Northern meadow jumping mouse, Z. hudsonius  (Preble's meadow jumping mouse,) and:
 Southern meadow jumping mouse, Z. luteus 
 South-western jumping mouse, Z. princeps   and:
 Oregon jumping mouse, Z. oregonus 
 South Pacific jumping mouse, Z. pacificus 
 North-western jumping mouse, Z. saltator 
 North Pacific Jumping Mouse, Z. trinotatus   and:
 Central Pacific jumping mouse, Z. montanus 
Family: Cricetidae
Subfamily: Arvicolinae
 White-footed vole, A. albipes  
 Red tree vole, A. longicaudus  
 California red tree mouse, A. pomo  
 Western red-backed vole, C. californicus  
 Southern red-backed vole, C. gapperi  
 Northern red-backed vole, C. rutilus  (Alaska only) 
 Northern collared lemming, D. groenlandicus  (Alaska only) 
 Nelson's collared lemming, D. nelsoni  (Alaska only) 
 Unalaska collared lemming, D. unalascensis  (Alaska only) 
 Sagebrush vole, L. curtatus  
 Nearctic brown lemming, L. trimucronatus  (Alaska only)  and:
 Beringian brown lemming, L. nigripes 
 Insular vole, M. abbreviatus (Alaska only)  and:
 Singing vole, M. miurus   (Alaska only) 
 California vole, M. californicus  
 Gray-tailed vole, M. canicaudus  
 Rock vole, M. chrotorrhinus  
Western meadow vole, M. drummondii 
Florida salt marsh vole, M. dukecampbelli 
 Long-tailed vole, M. longicaudus  
 Mexican vole, M. mexicanus  (including M. mogollonensis: ,)) and:
 Mogollon vole, M. mogollonensis 
 Montane vole, M. montanus  
 Prairie vole, M. ochrogaster  
 Tundra vole, M. oeconomus  (Alaska only) 
 Creeping vole, M. oregoni  
 Eastern meadow vole, M. pennsylvanicus 
Beach vole, M. p. breweri  
 Woodland vole, M. pinetorum  
 Water vole, M. richardsoni  
 Townsend's vole, M. townsendii  
 Taiga vole, M. xanthognathus  (Alaska only) 
 Round-tailed muskrat, N. alleni  
 Muskrat, O. zibethicus  
 Western heather vole, P. intermedius  
 Eastern heather vole, P. ungava  
 Northern bog lemming, S. borealis  
 Southern bog lemming, S. cooperi  
Subfamily: Neotominae
 Northern pygmy mouse, B. taylori  
 White-throated woodrat, N. albigula  
 Bryant's woodrat, N. bryanti  
 Bushy-tailed woodrat, N. cinerea  
 Arizona woodrat, N. devia  
 Eastern woodrat, N. floridana   (Key Largo woodrat,)
 Dusky-footed woodrat, N. fuscipes  
 Desert woodrat, N. lepida  
 White-toothed woodrat, Nv leucodon  
 Big-eared woodrat, N. macrotis  
 Allegheny woodrat, N. magister  
 Mexican woodrat, N. mexicana  
 Southern plains woodrat, N. micropus  
 Stephen's woodrat, N. stephensi  
 Golden mouse, O. nuttalli  
 Texas mouse, P. attwateri  
 Brush mouse, P. boylii  
 California mouse, P. californicus  
 Canyon mouse, P. crinitus  
 Cactus mouse, P. eremicus  
 Northern Baja deer mouse, P. fraterculus   
 Cotton mouse, P. gossypinus  
Gambel's deermouse, P. gambelii 
 Osgood's mouse, P. gratus  
 Northwestern deer mouse, P. keeni  
 southern white-ankled mouse, P. pectoralis  
Southern deermouse, P. labecula 
 White-footed mouse, P. leucopus  
 Eastern deermouse, P. maniculatus   
 Black-eared mouse, P. melanotis  
 Mesquite mouse, P. merriami  
 Northern rock mouse, P. nasutus  
 Oldfield mouse, P. polionotus   (Choctawatchee beach mouse, P. p. allophrys, Perdido Key beach mouse, P. p. trissyllepsis, St. Andrews beach mouse, P. p. peninsularis, Alabama beach mouse, P. p. ammobates and Anastasia Island beach mouse, P. p. phasma: , Southeastern beach mouse,)
Western deermouse, P. sonoriensis 
 Pinyon mouse, P. truei  
 Florida mouse, P. floridanus  
 Fulvous harvest mouse, R. fulvescens  
 Eastern harvest mouse, R. humulis  
 Western harvest mouse, R. megalotis  
 Plains harvest mouse, R. montanus  
 Salt marsh harvest mouse, R. raviventris   
Subfamily: Sigmodontinae
 Chihuahuan grasshopper mouse, O. arenicola  
 Northern grasshopper mouse, O. leucogaster  
 Southern grasshopper mouse, O. torridus  
Coues' rice rat, O. couesi  
 Common marsh rice rat, O. palustris  
 Arizona cotton rat, S. arizonae  
 Tawny-bellied cotton rat, S. fulviventer  
 Hispid cotton rat, S. hispidus  
 Yellow-nosed cotton rat, S. ochrognathus

Order: Lagomorpha (lagomorphs)

The lagomorphs comprise two families, Leporidae (hares and rabbits), and Ochotonidae (pikas). Though they can resemble rodents, and were classified as a superfamily in that order until the early 20th century, they have since been considered a separate order. They differ from rodents in a number of physical characteristics, such as having four incisors in the upper jaw rather than two.

Family: Ochotonidae (pikas)
 Collared pika, O. collaris  (Alaska only) 
 American pika, O. princeps  
Family: Leporidae (rabbits, hares)
 Pygmy rabbit, B. idahoensis   
 Antelope jackrabbit, L. alleni  
 Snowshoe hare, L. americanus  
 Black-tailed jackrabbit, L. californicus  
 White-sided jackrabbit, L. callotis  
 Alaskan hare, L. othus  (Alaska only) 
 White-tailed jackrabbit, L. townsendii  
 Swamp rabbit, S. aquaticus  
 Desert cottontail, S. audubonii  
 Brush rabbit, S. bachmani  
 Eastern cottontail, S. floridanus  
 Robust cottontail, S. holzneri  
 Mountain cottontail, S. nuttallii  
 Marsh rabbit, S. palustris   (Lower Keys marsh rabbit,)
 New England cottontail, S. transitionalis

Order: Eulipotyphla (shrews, hedgehogs, moles, and solenodons)

Eulipotyphlans are insectivorous mammals. Shrews and solenodons closely resemble mice, hedgehogs carry spines, while moles are stout-bodied burrowers.

Family: Soricidae (shrews)
Subfamily: Soricinae
Tribe: Blarinini
 Northern short-tailed shrew, B. brevicauda  
 Southern short-tailed shrew, B. carolinensis   and:
 Sherman's short-tailed shrew, B. shermani 
 Everglades short-tailed shrew, B. peninsulae 
 Elliot's short-tailed shrew, B. hylophaga  
 North American least shrew, C. parva   and:
Berlandier's least shrew, C. berlandieri 
Tribe: Notiosoricini
 Cockrum's gray shrew, N. cockrumi  
 Crawford's gray shrew, N. crawfordi   and:
 Ticul's gray shrew, N. tataticuli 
Tribe: Soricini
 Arctic shrew, S. arcticus  
 Arizona shrew, S. arizonae  
 Marsh shrew, S. bendirii  
 Cinereus shrew, S. cinereus   and:
 Maryland shrew, S. cinereus fontinalis 
 Long-tailed shrew, S. dispar   and:
 Gaspé shrew, S. gaspensis 
 Smoky shrew, S. fumeus  
 Prairie shrew, S. haydeni  
 American pygmy shrew, S. hoyi   and:
 Western pygmy shrew, S. eximius 
 Pribilof Island shrew, S. pribilofensis  (Alaska only) 
 Saint Lawrence Island shrew, Sorex jacksoni  (Alaska only) 
 Southeastern shrew, S. longirostris  
 Mount Lyell shrew, S. lyelli  
 Merriam's shrew, S. merriami  
 Dwarf shrew, S. nanus  
 Ornate shrew, S. ornatus  
 Southern montane shrew, S. monticolus   and:
Northern montane shrew, S. obscurus   
 New Mexico shrew, S. neomexicanus  
 Pacific shrew, S. pacificus   and:
 Baird's shrew, S. bairdi  
 American water shrew, S. palustris   and:
Eastern water shrew, S. albibarbis 
Western water shrew, S. navigator  and:
 Glacier Bay water shrew, S. alaskanus  (Alaska only) 
 Preble's shrew, S. preblei  
 Olympic shrew, S. rohweri   (formerly in Sorex cinereus)
 Fog shrew, S. sonomae  
 Inyo shrew, S. tenellus  
 Trowbridge's shrew, S. trowbridgii  
 Tundra shrew, S. tundrensis  (Alaska only) 
 Barren ground shrew, S. ugyunak  (Alaska only) 
 Vagrant shrew, S. vagrans  
 Eurasian least shrew, S. minutissimus   or:
 Alaska tiny shrew, S. yukonicus  (Alaska only) 
Family: Talpidae (moles)
Subfamily: Scalopinae
Tribe: Condylurini
 Star-nosed mole, C. cristata  
Tribe: Scalopini
 Hairy-tailed mole, P. breweri  
 Eastern mole, S. aquaticus  
 Northern broad-footed mole, S. latimanus   and:
 Southern broad-footed mole (S. occultus)
 Coast mole, S. orarius  
 Townsend's mole, S. townsendii  
Subfamily: Talpinae
Tribe: Neurotrichini
 Shrew-mole, N. gibbsii

Order: Chiroptera (bats)

The bats' most distinguishing feature is that their forelimbs are developed as wings, making them the only mammals capable of flight. Bat species account for about 20% of all mammals.

Family: Vespertilionidae
Subfamily: Myotinae
 Silver-haired bat, L. noctivagans  
 Southwestern myotis, M. auriculus   
 Southeastern myotis, M. austroriparius  
 California myotis, M. californicus  
 Western small-footed myotis, M. ciliolabrum   and:
 Dark-nosed small-footed myotis, M. melanorhinus  
 Long-eared myotis, M. evotis  
 Gray bat, M. grisescens   
 Keen's myotis, M. keenii  
 Eastern small-footed myotis, M. leibii  
 Little brown bat, M. lucifugus  
 Arizona myotis, M. occultus  
 Northern long-eared myotis, M. septentrionalis  
 Indiana bat, M. sodalis   
 Fringed myotis, M. thysanodes  
 Cave myotis, M. velifer  
 Long-legged myotis, M. volans  
 Yuma myotis, M. yumanensis  
Subfamily: Vespertilioninae
 Pallid bat, A. pallidus  
 Big brown bat, E. fuscus  
 Spotted bat, E. maculatum  
 Allen's big-eared bat, I. phyllotis  
 Eastern red bat, L. borealis  
 Hoary bat, A. cinereus   and
 Hawaiian hoary bat, A. semotus 
 Southern yellow bat, L. ega  
 Desert red bat, L. frantzii  - split from southern red bat, Lasiurus blossevillii 
 Seminole bat, L. seminolus  
 Southern yellow bat, D. ega  
 Northern yellow bat, D. intermedius  
 Western yellow bat, D. xanthinus  
 Evening bat, N. humeralis  
 Western pipistrelle, P. hesperus  
 Eastern pipistrelle, P. subflavus  
 Rafinesque's big-eared bat, P. rafinesquii  
 Townsend's big-eared bat, P. townsendii  (ssp. virginianus and ingens)
Family: Molossidae
 Wagner's bonneted bat, E. glaucinus  
 Florida bonneted bat, E. floridanus    
 Western mastiff bat, E. perotis  
 Underwood's bonneted bat, E. underwoodi  
 Velvety free-tailed bat, M. molossus   and:
 Pocketed free-tailed bat, N. femorosaccus  
 Big free-tailed bat, N. macrotis  
 Mexican free-tailed bat, T. brasiliensis  
Family: Mormoopidae
 Ghost-faced bat, M. megalophylla  
Family: Phyllostomidae
Subfamily: Phyllostominae
 California leaf-nosed bat, M. californicus  
Subfamily: Glossophaginae
 Mexican long-tongued bat, C. mexicana  
 Lesser long-nosed bat, L. yerbabuenae  
 Greater long-nosed bat, L. nivalis   
Subfamily: Stenodermatinae
 Velvety fruit-eating bat, E. hartii  
Subfamily: Desmodontinae
 Hairy-legged vampire bat, D. ecaudata

Order: Carnivora (carnivorans)

There are over 260 species of carnivorans, the majority of which feed primarily on meat. They have a characteristic skull shape and dentition.

Suborder: Feliformia
Family: Felidae (cats)
 Jaguarundi, H. yagouaroundi  (Ex?) 
 Ocelot, L. pardalis   
 Margay, L. wiedii  (Ex?) 
 Canada lynx, L. canadensis   
 Bobcat, L. rufus  
 Cougar, P. concolor   
 Jaguar, P. onca   
Suborder: Caniformia
Family: Canidae (dogs)
 Coyote, C. latrans  
 Gray wolf, C. lupus    (and )
 Arctic wolf, C. l. arctos  (Alaska only)   (and )
 Eastern wolf, C. l. lycaon 
 Red wolf, C. rufus    (and )
 Gray fox, U. cinereoargenteus  
 Island fox, U. littoralis  (ssp. littoralis, catalinae,)
 Arctic fox, V. lagopus  (Alaska only) 
 Kit fox, V. macrotis  
 Swift fox, V. velox  
 Red fox, V. vulpes  
Family: Ursidae (bears)
 American black bear, U. americanus   (Louisiana black bear U. a. luteolus)
 Polar bear, U. maritimus  (Alaska only)  
Family: Procyonidae (raccoons)
 Ring-tailed cat, B. astutus  
 White-nosed coati, N. narica  
 Raccoon, P. lotor  
Family: Mustelidae (mustelids)
 Sea otter, E. lutris   (ssp. nereis and kenyoni: , ssp. nereis also )
 Wolverine, G. gulo  
 North American river otter, L. canadensis  
 American marten, M. americana  
 Pacific marten, M. caurina 
 Beringian ermine or stoat, M. erminea   and:
 Haida ermine, M. haidarum   (Alaska only)
 American ermine, M. richardsonii 
 Black-footed ferret, M. nigripes    (and )
 Least weasel, M. nivalis  
 Long-tailed weasel, N. frenata  
 Sea mink, †N. macrodon  (E) 
 American mink, N. vison  
 Fisher, P. pennanti  
 American badger, T. taxus  
Family: Otariidae (eared seals, sealions)
 Guadalupe fur seal, A. townsendi   
 Northern fur seal, C. ursinus  
 Steller sea lion, E. jubatus    (except west of 144° W, where )
 California sea lion, Z. californianus  
Family: Mephitidae
 American hog-nosed skunk, C. leuconotus  
 Hooded skunk, M. macroura  
 Striped skunk, M. mephitis  
 Western spotted skunk, S. gracilis   and:
 Desert spotted skunk, S. leucoparia 
 Alleghanian spotted skunk, S. putorius   and:
 Plains spotted skunk, S. interrupta 
Family: Odobenidae
 Walrus, O. rosmarus  (Alaska only) 
Family: Phocidae (earless seals)
 Hooded seal, C. cristata  
 Bearded seal, E. barbatus  
 Gray seal, H. grypus  
 Ribbon seal, H. fasciata  (Alaska almost only) 
 Northern elephant seal, M. angustirostris  
 Hawaiian monk seal, N. schauinslandi  (Hawaiian Islands only)  
 Caribbean monk seal, †N. tropicalis  (E) 
 Harp seal, P. groenlandicus  
 Spotted seal, P. largha  (Alaska only)  
 Harbor seal, P. vitulina  
 Ringed seal, P. hispida

Order: Artiodactyla (even-toed ungulates)

The even-toed ungulates are ungulates whose weight is borne about equally by the third and fourth toes, rather than mostly or entirely by the third as in perissodactyls. There are about 220 artiodactyl species, including many that are of great economic importance to humans.

Family: Tayassuidae (peccaries)
 Collared peccary, D. tajacu  
Family: Cervidae (deer)
Subfamily: Cervinae
 Elk, C. canadensis 
Subfamily: Capreolinae
 Moose, A. alces 
 Mule deer, O. hemionus  
 White-tailed deer, O. virginianus   (Columbian white-tailed deer, O. v. leucurus, and key deer,)
 Caribou, R. tarandus (Alaska only)  (includes migratory woodland caribou, R. t. caribou: ,see also: barren-ground caribou, R. t. groenlandicus)
Family: Antilocapridae (pronghorn)
 Pronghorn, A. americana   (Sonoran pronghorn,)
Family: Bovidae (cattle, antelope, sheep, goats)
Subfamily: Bovinae
 American bison, B. bison   (wood bison,)
Subfamily: Caprinae
 Mountain goat, O. americanus  
 Muskox, O. moschatus  (Alaska only) 
 Bighorn sheep, O. canadensis   (desert bighorn sheep, O. c. nelsoni and Sierra Nevada bighorn sheep,)
 Dall sheep, O. dalli  (Alaska only)

Order: Sirenia (manatees and dugongs)

Sirenia is an order of fully aquatic, herbivorous mammals that inhabit rivers, estuaries, coastal marine waters, swamps, and marine wetlands.
Family: Dugongidae
 Steller's sea cow, †H. gigas (Alaska only)  (E) 
Family: Trichechidae
 West Indian manatee, T. manatus   (Antillean or Caribbean manatee: , ssp. latirostris - Florida manatee)

Order: Cetacea (whales)

The order Cetacea includes whales, dolphins and porpoises. They are the mammals most fully adapted to aquatic life with a spindle-shaped nearly hairless body, protected by a thick layer of blubber, and forelimbs and tail modified to provide propulsion underwater.

Suborder: Mysticeti
Family: Balaenidae
 Bowhead whale, B. mysticetus  (Alaska almost only) 
 North Atlantic right whale, E. glacialis   
 North Pacific right whale, E. japonica  (A) (Hawaiian Islands only) 
Family: Balaenopteridae
 Common minke whale, B. acutorostrata  
 Sei whale, B. borealis   
Species split from the Bryde's whale (B. edeni) (A) :
 Bryde's whale, B. brydei
 Rice's whale, B. ricei   
 Blue whale, B. musculus    (ssp. brevicauda - pygmy blue whale: , ssp. musculus North Pacific stock)
 Fin whale, B. physalus   
 Humpback whale, M. novaeangliae   
 Gray whale, E. robustus   
Suborder: Odontoceti
Superfamily: Platanistoidea
Family: Monodontidae
 Beluga, D. leucas   
 Narwhal, M. monoceros  (Alaska only) 
Family: Phocoenidae
 Harbour porpoise, P. phocoena  
 Dall's porpoise, P. dalli  
Family: Physeteridae
 Sperm whale, P. macrocephalus   
Family: Kogiidae
 Pygmy sperm whale, K. breviceps  
 Dwarf sperm whale, K. sima  (Hawaiian Islands only) 
Family: Ziphiidae
Subfamily: Ziphiinae
 Cuvier's beaked whale, Z. cavirostris  
Subfamily: Berardiinae
 Baird's beaked whale, B. bairdii   (collective name for two species - Baird's beaked whale and Arnoux's beaked whale)
Subfamily: Hyperoodontinae
 Northern bottlenose whale, H. ampullatus  
 Tropical bottlenose whale, I. pacificus  (Hawaiian Islands only) 
 Sowerby's beaked whale, M. bidens  
 Hubbs' beaked whale, M. carlhubbsi  
 Blainville's beaked whale, M. densirostris  
 Gervais' beaked whale, M. europaeus  
 Ginkgo-toothed beaked whale, M. ginkgodens  
 Hector's beaked whale, M. hectori  (A) 
 True's beaked whale, M. mirus  
 Perrin's beaked whale, M. perrini  
 Pygmy beaked whale, M. peruvianus  (A) 
 Stejneger's beaked whale, M. stejnegeri  
Family: Delphinidae (marine dolphins)
 Short-beaked common dolphin, D. delphis   and:
 Long-beaked common dolphin, D. capensis  
 Pygmy killer whale, F. attenuata  
 Short-finned pilot whale, G. macrorhynchus  
 Long-finned pilot whale, G. melas  
 Risso's dolphin, G. griseus  
 Fraser's dolphin, L. hosei  
 Atlantic white-sided dolphin, L. acutus  
 White-beaked dolphin, L. albirostris 
 Northern right whale dolphin, L. borealis  
 Killer whale, O. orca   
 Melon-headed whale, P. electra 
 False killer whale, P. crassidens  
 Pantropical spotted dolphin, S. attenuata  
 Clymene dolphin, S. clymene 
 Striped dolphin, S. coeruleoalba  
 Atlantic spotted dolphin, S. frontalis 
 Spinner dolphin, S. longirostris  
 Rough-toothed dolphin, S. bredanensis  
Pacific white-sided dolphin, S. obliquidens  
 Common bottlenose dolphin, T. truncatus

Introduced animals

Family: Echimyidae (Echimyinae, Myocastorini)
 Coypu, M. coypus  (I) 
Family: Sciuridae (squirrels)
 Mexican gray squirrel, S. aureogaster  (I) 
Family: Muridae (mice, rats, voles, gerbils, hamsters, etc.)
Subfamily: Murinae
 House mouse, M. musculus  (I) 
 Polynesian rat, R. exulans  (I) (Hawaiian Islands only) 
 Brown rat, R. norvegicus  (I) 
 Roof rat, R. rattus  (I) 
Family: Leporidae (rabbits, hares)
 Cape hare, L. capensis  (I) 
 European hare, L. europaeus  (I) 
 European rabbit, O. cuniculus  (I) (Hawaiian Islands only) (I) 
Family: Cebidae (capuchin and squirrel monkeys)
Common squirrel monkey, S. sciureus  (I) 
Family: Cercopithecidae (Old World monkeys) 
Vervet monkey, C. pygerythrus  (I) 
Japanese macaque, M. fuscata  (I)  
Rhesus monkey, M. mulatta  (I) 
Family: Herpestidae (mongoose)
 Small Indian mongoose  U. auropunctata (I) (Hawaiian Islands only) 
Family: Mustelidae (mustelids)
 Beech marten, M. foina  (I) 
Family: Suidae (pigs)
 Wild boar, S. scrofa  (I) 
Family: Cervidae (deer)
 Chital, A. axis  (I) 
 Indian hog deer, A. porcinus  (I) 
 Red deer, C. elaphus  (I) 
 Sika, C. nippon  (I) 
 European fallow deer, D. dama  (I) 
 Sambar, R. unicolor  (I) 
Family: Bovidae (cattle, antelope, sheep, goats)
Subfamily: Bovinae
 Nilgai, B. tragocamelus  (I) 
Subfamily: Hippotraginae
 Gemsbok, O. gazella  (I) 
Subfamily: Caprinae
 Barbary sheep, A. lervia  (I) 
 Bezoar ibex, C. a. aegagrus  (I) 
 Siberian ibex, C. sibirica  (I) 
 Himalayan tahr, H. jemlahicus  (I) 
Subfamily: Antilopinae
 Blackbuck, A. cervicapra  (I)

See also
List of mammals of Canada
List of mammals of North America
List of threatened mammals of the United States
List of chordate orders
Lists of mammals by region
Mammal classification

Notes

Species listed in Mammal Species of the World, 3rd edition (MSW3) as occurring in the USA, but omitted in this article: Pteronotus pristinus - possibly Florida.

References

Further reading

External links
American Society of Mammalogists
Databases: Division of Mammals: Department of Vertebrate Zoology: NMNH - i.e. printable Field Guide to mammals of North America
Search the Division of Mammals Collections - National Museum of Natural History, Smithsonian Institution
Mammal Species of the World, 3rd edition (MSW3) - database of mammalian taxonomy
IUCN Red List of Threatened Species (Search results: mammalia, USA, 2014-03-29)
Endangered Species Program - US Fish & Wildlife Service
Species Search - US Fish & Wildlife Service
Endangered Species Act - National Marine Fisheries Service - NOAA 
List of Endangered and threatened wildlife - US Government Printing Office